Spörl or Spoerl is a German surname. Notable people with the surname include:

 Harald Spörl (born 1966), German footballer and scout
 Heinrich Spoerl (1887–1955), German writer

German-language surnames